Haroldo Mariano (22 August 1928 – 1997) was a Brazilian diver. He competed in the men's 10 metre platform event at the 1948 Summer Olympics.

References

External links
 

1928 births
1997 deaths
Date of death missing
Brazilian male divers
Olympic divers of Brazil
Divers at the 1948 Summer Olympics
Divers from São Paulo
20th-century Brazilian people